The 5.7 Rock is a semi-automatic pistol developed, manufactured, and sold by Palmetto State Armory. It is chambered for the FN 5.7×28mm cartridge and is characterized by its generally low recoil. It is a competitor to the Five-seven, Ruger-57, and M&P 5.7.

Design 
The gun uses a smooth single-action striker-fired trigger mechanism.

The frame is made out of polymer, the slide and barrel are made out of 416 stainless steel and the magazine is made out of black oxide alloy steel. PSA offers the barrel finished in motley colours, it can be bought threaded and non-threaded.

See also 

FN Five-seven

M&P 5.7

Ruger-57

References 

5.7×28mm firearms